Catherine Jeanne Annen is a French geologist at the Czech Academy of Sciences. Her research considers igneous bodies, volcanic eruptions. and exploration for geothermal energy. She was awarded the 2022 Geological Society of London Bigsby Medal.

Early life and education 
Annen studied earth sciences at the University of Geneva. Alongside her studies she worked as a teaching assistant on the modelling of volcanic processes. She remained in Geneva for graduate research, working partly at the Blaise Pascal University. Her research considered how to model the growth of volcanoes. After earning her doctorate, Annen joined the University of Bristol, where she worked on models of magma injection and incrementally emplaced intrusions.

Research and career 
Annen returned to the University of Geneva in 2003, where she worked as an assistant professor. She was appointed to the faculty at the University of Bristol in 2009. Her research combined numerical simulations with heat transfer models to better understand magmatic processes. She was particularly interested in the genesis of differentiated melts and how pluton emplacement impacts the growth of large magma chambers. She studied the Soufrière Hills and Mount Pelée. She uncovered the environmental circumstances that determine the frequency of volcanic activity and the magnitude of volcanic phenomena. Small frequent eruptions are triggered by magma replenishment, whilst larger eruptions are caused by magma buoyancy. This buoyancy results in less frequent eruptions and is powered by the accumulation of less dense magma underneath volcanoes. Her findings predict that the largest possible volcanic eruption would result in the release of 3,500 km3 of magma.

Annen was made Chief Editor of Frontiers in Earth Sciences in 2015. In 2022 she was elected Vice President of the Volcanic and igneous plumbing systems committee. In 2021 Annen joined the Czech Academy of Sciences where she works on the formation and differentiation of magma chambers.

Awards and honours 
 2022 Geological Society of London Bigsby Medal

Selected publications

References 

French geologists
Women geologists
University of Geneva alumni
Year of birth missing (living people)
Place of birth missing (living people)
Living people
People associated with the Czech Academy of Sciences